The Chinese Sociological Review is a quarterly peer-reviewed academic journal of sociology, with a specific focus on Chinese societies (the mainland, Hong Kong, Taiwan, and abroad). The journal was established in 1968 as Chinese Sociology & Anthropology, obtaining its current name in 2011 (《中华社会学评论》in Chinese). It is published by Routledge and since 2011 the editor-in-chief is Xiaogang Wu (New York University Shanghai and New York University). The journal is sponsored by Shanghai University and New York University Shanghai. According to the Journal Citation Reports, the journal has a 2021 impact factor of 3.667, ranking it 29th out of 148 journals in the category "Sociology".

References

External links

Publications established in 1968
Sociology journals
Routledge academic journals
English-language journals
Chinese studies journals